Elidiptera is a genus of planthoppers belonging to the family Achilidae.

Species:

Elidiptera callosa 
Elidiptera globulifera 
Elidiptera guianae 
Elidiptera regularis 
Elidiptera rutescens 
Elidiptera stabilis

References

Achilidae
Hemiptera genera